Rhinodoras thomersoni is a species of thorny catfish native to Colombia and Venezuela where it is found in the river basins along the southwest shore of Lake Maracaibo (Santa Ana, Catatumbo and Escalante Rivers).  This species grows to a length of  SL.

References 
 

Doradidae
Freshwater fish of Colombia
Fish of Venezuela
Fish described in 1984